The men's 880 yards at the 1962 British Empire and Commonwealth Games as part of the athletics programme was held at the Perry Lakes Stadium on Saturday 24 November 1962 and Monday 26 November.

The top two runners in each of the six heats qualified for the semifinals. There were two semifinals, and only the top three from each heat advanced to the final.

The event was won by the world recorder holder and the 800 metres Olympic champion, New Zealander Peter Snell in 1:47.6 seconds, setting a new Games record time. Snell won by 0.2 seconds ahead of the Olympic bronze medallist, Jamaican George Kerr and Tony Blue of Australia who won the bronze.

Records

The following records were established during the competition:

Heats

Heat 1

Heat 2

Heat 3

Heat 4

Heat 5

Heat 6

Semifinals

Semifinal 1

Semifinal 2

Final

References

Men's 880 yards
1962